Charles Williams (September 27, 1898 – January 3, 1958) was an American actor and writer. He appeared in over 260 film and television productions between 1922 and 1956. He also worked as a writer on 30 films between 1932 and 1954.

He started his film career in the early 1920s in Paramount's New York studios, where he made his film debut in The Old Homestead, but also worked behind the camera as a writer and assistant director. With the arrival of sound film, he went to Hollywood and became a supporting actor there. The actor with the short stature and high-pitched voice was often uncredited for his appearances, although he had larger roles in a number of B movies.

Williams was known as a "B-movie regular", who often portrayed quirky, somewhat nerdy, bespectacled clerks, photographers and especially reporters. He is perhaps-best remembered today for appearing in It's a Wonderful Life as Eustace, George Bailey's cousin and co-worker at the Building and Loan. Near the end of his life and career, Williams also played in a number of television series.

Selected filmography 

 The Old Homestead (1922) - Gabe Waters
 Action Galore (1925) - Luke McLean
 The Mad Genius (1931) - Stagehand (uncredited)
 Forgotten Women (1931) - Jerry - Stagehand (uncredited)
 Delicious (1931) - Honeymooner (uncredited)
 Dance Team (1932) - Benny Weber
 Letty Lynton (1932) - Reporter (uncredited)
 Strangers of the Evening (1932) - 1st Passerby
 Radio Patrol (1932) - Axe-Murderer Suspect (uncredited)
 Blondie of the Follies (1932) - Mr. Kinskey - Lottie's Friend (uncredited)
 70,000 Witnesses (1932) - Reporter (uncredited)
 Faithless (1932) - Reporter (uncredited)
 Madison Square Garden (1932) - Reporter at Ringside (uncredited)
 Flesh (1932) - Radio Sports Reporter (uncredited)
 The Devil Is Driving (1932) - Bill Jones (uncredited)
 Frisco Jenny (1932) - Party Guest (uncredited)
 Central Airport (1933) - El Paso Hotel Desk Clerk (uncredited)
 Made on Broadway (1933) - Photographer (uncredited)
 The Nuisance (1933) - Skating Rink Official (uncredited)
 Gambling Ship (1933) - Baby Face
 Sitting Pretty (1933) - A Neighbor (uncredited)
 Dancing Lady (1933) - Man Arrested in Burlesque Theater (uncredited)
 The Big Shakedown (1934) - Man Buying Aspirin (uncredited)
 This Side of Heaven (1934) - Jimmy - Reporter (uncredited)
 The Crosby Case (1934) - Taxi Rider (uncredited)
 The Show-Off (1934) - Smith (uncredited)
 The Lost Jungle (1934) - Cub Reporter
 A Very Honorable Guy (1934) - Druggist (uncredited)
 Sadie McKee (1934) - Pest in Cafe (uncredited)
 Private Scandal (1934) - Reporter (uncredited)
 The Thin Man (1934) - Fighter Manager (uncredited)
 Now I'll Tell (1934) - One of Honey Smith's Boys (uncredited)
 Friends of Mr. Sweeney (1934) - Vender (scenes deleted)
 The Cat's-Paw (1934) - Reporter (uncredited)
 The Girl from Missouri (1934) - Photographer with Sullivan (uncredited)
 Dames (1934) - Dance Director (uncredited)
 Woman in the Dark (1934) - Hotel Desk Clerk
 The Drag-Net (1936) - Reporter (uncredited)
 Rhythm on the Range (1936) - Gopher Mazda
 Charlie Chan at the Race Track (1936) - Reporter (uncredited)
 Hollywood Boulevard (1936) - Reporter (uncredited)
 Wedding Present (1936) - Reporter (uncredited)
 Rose Bowl (1936) - Football Player (uncredited)
 Four Days' Wonder (1936) - Kasky
 Arizona Mahoney (1936) - Short Cowhand (uncredited)
 Crack-Up (1936) - Reporter (uncredited)
 Sinner Take All (1936) - Minor Role (uncredited)
 Sing Me a Love Song (1936) - Man Listening to Haines Sing (uncredited)
 Love Is News (1937) - Joe Brady
 Espionage (1937) - Simmons (uncredited)
 Fair Warning (1937) - Hotel Clerk (uncredited)
 History Is Made at Night (1937) - Room Service Waiter on Ship (uncredited)
 Jim Hanvey, Detective (1937) - Brackett
 A Star Is Born (1937) - Hanley (uncredited)
 As Good as Married (1937) - Lecturer (uncredited)
 Turn Off the Moon (1937) - Brooks
 Big Business (1937) - Florist Shop Customer (uncredited)
 Sing and Be Happy (1937) - Small Man (uncredited)
 Flying Fists (1937) - Meggs, the Reporter
 Wake Up and Live (1937) - Charlie Alberts, Agent
 The Lady Escapes (1937) - Florist (uncredited)
 Walter Wanger's Vogues of 1938 (1937) - Customs Man in Fall Show (uncredited)
 It Happened in Hollywood (1937) - Hymie - Photographer (uncredited)
 Charlie Chan on Broadway (1937) - Meeker
 Behind the Mike (1937) - Crunchie-Munchie Effect Man (uncredited)
 Sky Racket (1937) - Night Club Comedian (uncredited)
 Partners in Crime (1937) - Messenger (uncredited)
 Stand-In (1937) - Mr. Mack (uncredited)
 Merry-Go-Round of 1938 (1937) - Dave Clark
 Blossoms on Broadway (1937) - Elevator Man (uncredited)
 Amateur Crook (1937) - Drunk Witness
 Love and Hisses (1937) - Irving Skolsky
 In Old Chicago (1938) - Secretary / Wedding Witness (uncredited)
 Man-Proof (1938) - Reporter (uncredited)
 The Lone Ranger (1938) - Cub Reporter (uncredited)
 Born to Be Wild (1938) - Company Spotter
 Hollywood Stadium Mystery (1938) - Jake
 Mr. Moto's Gamble (1938) - Gabby Marden
 Joy of Living (1938) - Pitchman at Recording Studio (uncredited)
 Alexander's Ragtime Band (1938) - Agent
 The Marines Are Here (1938) - Bartender (uncredited)
 Men with Wings (1938) - Telegraph Operator (uncredited)
 Little Miss Broadway (1938) - Mike Brody
 Gateway (1938) - Reporter (uncredited)
 Hold That Co-ed (1938) - McFinch (uncredited)
 Just Around the Corner (1938) - Candid Cameraman (uncredited)
 Trade Winds (1938) - Reporter Jones (uncredited)
 Ambush (1939) - Hardware Wholesaler (uncredited)
 Wife, Husband and Friend (1939) - Jaffee
 The Ice Follies of 1939 (1939) - Max Morton (uncredited)
 The Flying Irishman (1939) - Repo Man (uncredited)
 My Wife's Relatives (1939) - (uncredited)
 Undercover Doctor (1939) - Pinky Valkus
 Unexpected Father (1939) - Timid Man (uncredited)
 Those High Grey Walls (1939) - Stranger (uncredited)
 Sabotage (1939) - Minor Role (uncredited)
 Days of Jesse James (1939) - Northern Hotel Clerk (uncredited)
 Charlie McCarthy, Detective (1939) - Peters (uncredited)
 Women Without Names (1940) - Hugh Gilman (uncredited)
 Johnny Apollo (1940) - Photographer (uncredited)
 Primrose Path (1940) - Man in Diner (uncredited)
 Enemy Agent (1940) - Restaurant Patron (uncredited)
 Girl in 313 (1940) - Henry - Husband
 Grand Ole Opry (1940) - Politician (uncredited)
 Marked Men (1940) - Charlie Sloane
 You're the One (1941) - Soda Jerk
 The Great Train Robbery (1941) - McCoy (uncredited)
 Mr. District Attorney (1941) - Detective in Café (uncredited)
 The Lady from Cheyenne (1941) - Clerk
 Reaching for the Sun (1941) - Truck Driver
 Angels with Broken Wings (1941) - (uncredited)
 Down in San Diego (1941) - Cigar Salesman (uncredited)
 Flying Cadets (1941) - Mr. Prim / Primmie, Bookkeeper
 Melody Lane (1941) - Thomas Assistant (uncredited)
 Don't Get Personal (1942) - Shell Game Spectator (uncredited)
 Blue, White and Perfect (1942) - Theodore H. Sherman Jr.- Printer
 The Fleet's In (1942) - Photographer (uncredited)
 Roxie Hart (1942) - Photographer (uncredited)
 Girls' Town (1942) - Coffer
 The Affairs of Jimmy Valentine (1942) - The Pitchman
 The Great Man's Lady (1942) - Assayer (uncredited)
 Inside the Law (1942) - Auctioneer (uncredited)
 My Favorite Spy (1942) - 3rd Speaker in Park (uncredited)
 One Thrilling Night (1942) - Theatre Manager (uncredited)
 Night in New Orleans (1942) - Citizen (uncredited)
 The Pride of the Yankees (1942) - Little Strength Machine Contestant (uncredited)
 Joan of Ozark (1942) - Representative (uncredited)
 Tales of Manhattan (1942) - Orman's Bespectacled Agent (Boyer sequence) (uncredited)
 Call of the Canyon (1942) - Agent (uncredited)
 Isle of Missing Men (1942) - Jo-Jo
 Secrets of the Underground (1942) - Hypo-News Photographer (uncredited)
 Time to Kill (1942) - The Dentist (uncredited)
 Ice-Capades Revue (1942) - Menkin (uncredited)
 Salute for Three (1943) - Sailor (uncredited)
 Chatterbox (1943) - Agent (uncredited)
 Redhead from Manhattan (1943) - Box Office Attendant (uncredited)
 I Escaped from the Gestapo (1943) - Secretary (uncredited)
 Sarong Girl (1943) - Mr. Chase
 The West Side Kid (1943) - Reporter (uncredited)
 Nobody's Darling (1943) - News Photographer (uncredited)
 Always a Bridesmaid (1943) - Saunders
 The Girl from Monterrey (1943) - Harry Hollis
 Where Are Your Children? (1943) - Mack - Comical Sailor
 Whispering Footsteps (1943) - 2nd Bank Teller (uncredited)
 Career Girl (1944) - Louis Horton
 Sweethearts of the U.S.A. (1944) - Mr. Pike
 Rosie the Riveter (1944) - Poker Player (uncredited)
 Song of the Open Road (1944) -  Man Saying 'It's a Trick' (uncredited)
 Goodnight, Sweetheart (1944) - Reporter (uncredited)
 Since You Went Away (1944) - Man in Cocktail Lounge (uncredited)
 Johnny Doesn't Live Here Anymore (1944) - Court Recorder (uncredited)
 Call of the Rockies (1944) - Burton Witherspoon
 Atlantic City (1944) - Chalmers
 Kansas City Kitty (1944) - George W. Pivet (uncredited)
 Greenwich Village (1944) - Drake - Author (uncredited)
 A Wave, a WAC and a Marine (1944) -Reporter (uncredited)
 Irish Eyes Are Smiling (1944) - Song Promoter (uncredited)
 End of the Road (1944) - Jordan
 Lake Placid Serenade (1944) - Reporter (uncredited)
 Gentle Annie (1944) - Candy Butcher (uncredited)
 The Man Who Walked Alone (1945) - Moe
 Identity Unknown (1945) - Auctioneer
 Hollywood and Vine (1945) - Chick Jones
 Honeymoon Ahead (1945) - Dinky (uncredited)
 Out of This World (1945) - Joe Welch (uncredited)
 Scared Stiff (1945) - Reporter (uncredited)
 Hitchhike to Happiness (1945) - Park Magician (uncredited)
 Guest Wife (1945) - Photographer (uncredited)
 Love, Honor and Goodbye (1945) - Barker at 'Happy Land' (uncredited)
 Duffy's Tavern (1945) - Smith's Assistant (uncredited)
 Doll Face (1945) - Orville, the Drug Store Clerk (uncredited)
 A Guy Could Change (1946) - Husband (uncredited)
 The Postman Always Rings Twice (1946) - Doctor (uncredited)
 Rainbow Over Texas (1946) - Telegrapher (uncredited)
 Passkey to Danger (1946) - Mr. Williams
 Without Reservations (1946) - Louis Burt (uncredited)
 Do You Love Me (1946) - Bellhop with Box of Roses (uncredited)
 Joe Palooka, Champ (1946) - Mr. Polonski (uncredited)
 Our Hearts Were Growing Up (1946) - Cab Driver (uncredited)
 Deadline for Murder (1946) - Pat - Photographer (uncredited)
 A Boy, a Girl and a Dog (1946) - Mr. Stone
 Night and Day (1946) - Music Store Customer (uncredited)
 Red River Renegades (1946) - Clerk (uncredited)
 Queen of Burlesque (1946) - Carr - Hotel Clerk (uncredited)
 Two Guys from Milwaukee (1946) - Soundman (uncredited)
 Lady Chaser (1946) - Apartment House Manager
 Heldorado (1946) - Carnival Judge
 It's a Wonderful Life (1946) - Cousin Eustace
 Yankee Fakir (1947) - Cad (uncredited)
 Saddle Pals (1947) - Leslie
 The Trespasser (1947) - Doorkeeper (uncredited)
 The Spirit of West Point (1947) - Bill (uncredited)
 Her Husband's Affairs (1947) - Cruise Line Clerk (uncredited)
 Heading for Heaven (1947) - Eddie Williams
 My Wild Irish Rose (1947) - Husband (uncredited)
 April Showers (1948) - Stage Manager (uncredited)
 Half Past Midnight (1948) - Little Man Outside Apartment (uncredited)
 Hazard (1948) - Little Man in his Car
 The Dude Goes West (1948) - Harris (uncredited)
 Marshal of Amarillo (1948) - Hiram Short
 Texas, Brooklyn and Heaven (1948) - Reporter (uncredited)
 Embraceable You (1948) - Albert Martin, Realtor (uncredited)
 Good Sam (1948) - Little Man (scenes deleted)
 The Strange Mrs. Crane (1948) - McLean
 Parole, Inc. (1948) - Titus Jones
 The Accused (1949) - Dorgan's Assistant (uncredited)
 The Judge (1949) - Reporter
 Grand Canyon (1949) - Bert
 Arson, Inc. (1949) - Bookie (uncredited)
 Task Force (1949) - Luggage Salesman (uncredited)
 The Woman on Pier 13 (1949) - Speaker in Park (uncredited)
 Paid in Full (1950) - Painter in Nursery (uncredited)
 Counterspy Meets Scotland Yard (1950) - Taxi Driver (uncredited)
 The Missourians (1950) - Walt - Postmaster
 Gasoline Alley (1951) - Mortie
 Lullaby of Broadway (1951) - Reporter (uncredited)
 Kentucky Jubilee (1951) - Yes Man
 According to Mrs. Hoyle (1951) - Charlie
 Criminal Lawyer (1951) - Juror (uncredited)
 Painting the Clouds with Sunshine (1951) - Husband (uncredited)
 A Millionaire for Christy (1951) - Reporter with Glasses (uncredited)
 Corky of Gasoline Alley (1951) - Morty (uncredited)
 Has Anybody Seen My Gal? (1952) - Reporter (uncredited)
 She's Working Her Way Through College (1952) - Waiter (uncredited)
 The Magnetic Monster (1953) - Cabbie
 Main Street to Broadway (1953) - Bartender (uncredited)
 The Twinkle in God's Eye (1955) - Assayer (uncredited)
 A Lawless Street (1955) - Mr. Willis (uncredited)
 Fighting Trouble (1956) - Smoggy Smith (uncredited)

References

External links 

 

1898 births
1958 deaths
American male film actors
20th-century American male actors